36 Editions of the Girabola have been played so far, with different systems. 7 Teams have won the girabola title, namely Petro Atlético de Luanda (15), Primeiro de Agosto (9), Atlético Sport Aviação (3), Grupo Desportivo Interclube (2), Primeiro de Maio de Benguela (2), Clube Desportivo Recreativo do Libolo (2) and Clube Desportivo Sagrada Esperança (1).

1979 - 1980 Season

1980 - 1981 Season

1981 - 1982 Season

1982 - 1983 Season

1983 - 1984 Season

1984 - 1985 Season

1985 - 1986 Season

1986 - 1987 Season

1987 - 1988 Season

1988 - 1989 Season

1989 - 1990 Season

1990 - 1991 Season

1991 - 1992 Season

1992 - 1993 Season

1993 - 1994 Season

1994 - 1995 Season

1995 - 1996 Season

1996 - 1997 Season

1997 - 1998 Season

1998 - 1999 Season

1999 - 2000 Season

2000 - 2001 Season

2001 - 2002 Season

2002 - 2003 Season

2003 - 2004 Season

2004 - 2005 Season

2005 - 2006 Season

2006 - 2007 Season

2007 - 2008 Season

2008 - 2009 Season

2009 - 2010 Season

2010 - 2011 Season

2011 - 2012 Season

2012 - 2013 Season

2013 - 2014 Season

2014 - 2015 Season

References